William "Billy" H. Clune (August 18, 1862 – October 18, 1927) was an American railroad property developer, film exchange and then theater chain owner, film studio owner, and film producer.

Career
Born in Hannibal, Missouri, Clune owned a chain of theaters in Southerm California. He launched his studio in 1915. His film productions were based on novels. His first production was 1916's Ramona.

He played hardball with competitors. He came into dispute with Nell Shipman over their film projects together.

He died in Los Angeles, two months past his 65th birthday. He is buried at the Hollywood Forever Cemetery in a crypt.

Clune was an investor in Epoch Film Producing Corp. The Birth of a Nation, originally released as The Clansman in February 1915, had its world premiere at Clune's Auditorium on Pershing Square in the Core of Los Angeles.

Filmography
Ramona (1916), based the book Ramona by Helen Hunt Jackson about life in California's early days
The Eyes of the World (1917), filmed in Redlands, California, adapted from the Harold Bell Wright story
From Manger to Cross
A Bear, a Boy and a Dog by Nell Shipman
The Girl From God's Country (1920)

References

External links
 
 
 
 "Unsung Film Pioneer: William H. Clune; theater and film producer" from Hollywoodland

1862 births
1927 deaths
People from Hannibal, Missouri
American film producers